Susan Jean Jones (born May 12, 1948), also known by her married name Suzy Roy, is an American former competition swimmer, Olympic swimmer and former World Record Holder.

Suzy Jones was born in Palo Alto, California.  She trained under coach George Haines at the Santa Clara Swim Club in Santa Clara, California.

Jones represented the United States at the 1968 Summer Olympics in Mexico City.  She swam for the gold medal-winning U.S. team in the preliminary heats of the women's 4x100 medley relay, but did not receive a medal under the 1968 Olympic rules because she did not swim in the event final.  She also competed in the semifinals of the women's 100-meter breaststroke, finishing in 10th place with a time of 1:18.6.

Life after competition swimming

Jones continued to stay active in swimming for over 50 years as a competitor, coach and swim instructor.  She continues teaching at the present time.

She competed in US Masters swimming for 25 years.  Susan set 30 USMS records between the years of 1976-2001, in the 50, 100, and 200 yards/meters breaststroke events and 100yards/meters Individual Medley.  Jones also set 7 Masters World Records in the breaststroke events from 1986-2001.

Jones married in 1975 and has four sons and three grandchildren.

References

1948 births
Living people
American female breaststroke swimmers
Olympic swimmers of the United States
Sportspeople from Palo Alto, California
Swimmers at the 1968 Summer Olympics
University of California, Los Angeles alumni
20th-century American women